The Luchak Formation (Russian: Luchak Svita) is an Albian geologic formation in Tajikistan.

Fossil content 
Fossil sauropod tracks of Babatagosauropus bulini, Kafirniganosauropus, Akmechetosauropus makhkamovi and Chorrokhosauropus khakimovi have been reported from the formation.

See also 
 List of dinosaur-bearing rock formations
 List of stratigraphic units with sauropodomorph tracks
 Sauropod tracks

References

Bibliography 
  

Geologic formations of Tajikistan
Lower Cretaceous Series of Asia
Albian Stage
Limestone formations
Shallow marine deposits
Ichnofossiliferous formations
Fossiliferous stratigraphic units of Asia
Paleontology in Tajikistan